Robin Ghosh (1939–2016) was a Bangladeshi-descent Pakistani film score composer. He scored music for 47 films in Urdu and Bengali. The following is a complete list of the films he composed:

1960s

1970s

1980s

1990-present

Unreleased

Background Score Only

References

Sources
 

Discographies of Bangladeshi artists
Discographies of Pakistani artists